Mariette Hansson (born 23 January 1983), sometimes credited as MaryJet or simply Mariette, is a Swedish singer and songwriter. Hansson participated in Sikta mot stjärnorna (Swedish pre-selection for European Soundmix Show) in 1999 imitating singer Amanda Marshall. She participated in Idol 2009 which was broadcast on TV4 and finished fourth. A year later, Hansson was announced as "homo of the year" at the QX Gaygala in Stockholm.

In 2013, she played guitar in Magnus Ugglas band during his show "Magnus Den Store" at Hamburger Börs in Stockholm. In 2014 she toured along with Ace Wilder who placed second in Melodifestivalen 2014, the Swedish pre-selection for the  Eurovision Song Contest.

She has taken part in Melodifestivalen, Sweden's pre-selection for the Eurovision Song Contest, five times and qualified to the final each time. She first participated in Melodifestivalen 2015 with the song "Don't Stop Believing". She took part in the second semifinal and qualified for the final in Friends Arena, eventually reaching the third place in the contest. Two years later she returned to the contest and took part in Melodifestivalen 2017 with the song "A Million Years". She qualified to the final on 11 March 2017 where she placed fourth. Next year she participated in Melodifestivalen a third time with the song "For You" which finished fifth in the Grand Final. She returned to the contest in 2020 with the song "Shout It Out" and qualified to the final, where she finished in tenth place, scoring 51 points. After that in 2023 she participated once again with the song "One Day" and qualified to the final through the Second Chance round.

Discography

Studio albums

Extended plays

Singles

References

External links

Swedish pop singers
Swedish rock singers
English-language singers from Sweden
Swedish LGBT singers
1983 births
Living people
Idol (Swedish TV series) participants
21st-century Swedish singers
21st-century Swedish women singers
Melodifestivalen contestants of 2023
Melodifestivalen contestants of 2020
Melodifestivalen contestants of 2018
Melodifestivalen contestants of 2017
Melodifestivalen contestants of 2015